Dawn McBride is a social scientist and professor of psychology at Illinois State University. McBride has published several textbooks in the field of psychology, such as Cognitive Psychology: Theory, Process, and Methodology, and The Process of Research and Statistical Analysis in Psychology. 

Her research interests include automatic forms of memory, false memory, prospective memory, task order choices, and forgetting. She has taught courses in introductory psychology, statistics, research methods, cognition and learning, human memory, and a graduate course in experimental design. She is a recipient of the Illinois State University Teaching Initiative Award and the Illinois State University SPA/Psi Chi Jim Johnson Award for commitment to undergraduate mentorship, involvement, and achievement.
McBride has published over 50 articles and book chapters that have been cited over 1200 times, giving her an h-index of 19.

Education
McBride received her Ph.D. in psychology and her M.A. in social science from the University of California, Irvine, and her B.A. in psychology from the University of California, Los Angeles.

References 

Living people
Year of birth missing (living people)
Social scientists
Cognitive-behavioral psychotherapists
Cognitive development
American women psychologists